King of the Coral Sea is a 1954 film starring Chips Rafferty and Charles Tingwell, directed by Lee Robinson and shot on location in Thursday Island. It was one of the most commercially successful Australian films of the 1950s and was Rod Taylor's film debut.

Synopsis
A body is found floating in the Torres Strait and pearler Ted King is asked to investigate. He discovers the murder is connected to a people smuggling ring and involves one of his men, Yusep. He is helped by Peter Merriman, the playboy owner of King's company who romances King's daughter Rusty. Yusep kidnaps Rusty but Merriman and King rescue her.

Cast
Chips Rafferty as Ted King
Charles Tingwell as Peter Merriman
Ilma Adey as Rusty King
Rod Taylor as Jake Janiero
Lloyd Berrell as Yusep
Reg Lye as Grundy
Charles Peverill as Sergeant Charlie Wright
Frances Chin Soon as Serena

Production
Lee Robinson had previously made a documentary on the pearling industry, The Pearlers (1949). All Australian slang was removed from the script to ensure it would not be confusing for international audiences. The shoot took place from June to October 1953.

Casting
The supporting cast included Rod Taylor in his film debut. He played an American who elected to stay on in Australia after World War II, a character Robinson created with the aim of making the film appealing to the international market. Taylor, Robinson, Rafferty, Charles Tingwell and Lloyd Berrell all knew each other from working in Sydney radio. Also featured in the cast were Ilma Adey, a model and cabaret entertainer without any previous acting experience, and Frances Chin Soon, a local nurse from Thursday Island.

Underwater photography
The film was shot almost entirely on location on Thursday Island, except for the underwater footage, which was filmed off Green Island. Noel Monkman was primarily responsible for this. The filming was unique as the cameraman and the actors dived with a rare scuba known as the Lawson Lung. It was a patent violation of the Cousteau-Gagnan patented Aqua Lung. It had a unique appearance, which came from the tank being worn on the diver's back, with the regulator worn on the chest. The Lawson Lung was made in Sydney in small numbers, because getting scuba gear in Australia was very difficult at the time. Rafferty dived in an open British made Heinke helmet as well as using the Lawson Lung towards the end of the film. Thursday Island was known for its pearl shells, which were collected for jewelry and buttons. The film was noted for the documentation of pearl shell divers and the luggers they sailed in.

Release
The film was originally entitled King of the Arafura but was retitled King of the Coral Sea as it was felt the Coral Sea was a better known sea than the Arafura. The world premiere was held on Thursday Island on 17 July 1954, with a simultaneous screening in Melbourne. The film enjoyed a successful release and Robinson estimated it tripled its costs within three months. A "Queen of the Coral Sea" competition was held to promote the movie.

References

External links
King of the Coral Sea in the Internet Movie Database
Youtube clip from film
King of the Coral Sea at the Rod Taylor Site
King of the Coral Sea at Australian Screen Online
King of the Coral Sea at Oz Movies

1954 films
Films directed by Lee Robinson
Seafaring films
1954 crime films
Films shot in Australia
Australian crime films
1950s English-language films
Australian black-and-white films